Peru women's national handball team is the team that represents Peru in international handball competitions and is governed by the Federacion Deportiva Peruana de Handball.

Tournament history

Pan American Games

South American Games

Bolivarian Games

Current squad
The squad chosen for the 2019 Pan American Games in Lima, Peru.

Head coach: Mario Ramos

References

External links
IHF profile

Handball
Women's national handball teams
National team